Emery Kay Hunt (born November 13, 1937), better known as E. K. Hunt or Kay Hunt,  is an Emeritus Professor of Economics at the University of Utah.

History 
He was born in Blanding, Utah, the son of Emery Rulond Hunt (1914–1994) and Minerva Kartchner (b. 1917). He has one brother and four sisters. Hunt has two children, Jeff Hunt and Andrew Hunt. Andrew is a professor of history at the University of Waterloo.

E. K. Hunt received his bachelor's degree in 1961 and his Ph.D. in 1968 from the University of Utah. He has taught at five universities including the University of California, Riverside from 1969 to 1978, after which he joined the faculty at the University of Utah. From 1983 to 1989, he was chair of the University of Utah Department of Economics.

First name
Genealogical sources give Hunt's first name as "Emery." Amazon.com gives Hunt's first name as "Emerson" for the March 1986 paperback edition of Economics: An Introduction to Traditional and Radical Views.

See also

 Economics
 History of economic thought

Bibliography
 
 
 
  Foreword by Robert Pollin
  Foreword by Robert Pollin. Editions of this book prior to 2008 used the title Economics: an introduction to traditional and radical views
 
 
 
 Uma Introducao a Moderna Teoria Microeconomica by E. K. Hunt and H. J. Sherman (1977)
 Macroeconomia – O Enfoque Tradicional by E. K. Hunt and Howard J. Sherman (1977)
 Socialist Revolution No. 32 (Vol.7, No. 2) March – April, 1977 by E. K. Hunt. Et al. and Socialist Review Collective (1977)
 
 
 
 
  An essay.
 
 
 
 
  Foreword by Robin Hahnel

References

External links
Thorstein Veblen: A Marxist Starting Point, a paper by Kirsten Ford and William McColloch.

1937 births
Living people
University of Utah faculty
Economists from Utah
University of California, Riverside faculty
University of Utah alumni
People from San Juan County, Utah
Economists from California